Kassanda is a town in Kassanda District, in the Buganda area of Uganda.

Location
The coordinates of the Kassanda are 0°32'48.0"N, 31°49'11.0"E (Latitude:0.546670; Longitude:31.819719).

Overview
Prior to 2013, the town was a quiet rural settlement. Then someone discovered a gold nugget on one of the hills in town. While gold has been known to exist in the area, this new find led to an influx of "prospectors" from outside the area. They came from as far away as Rwanda and DR Congo. Many were previously unemployed or underemployed youth from the streets of Kampala. This has led to an impromptu "gold rush", with miners, washers, refiners, middlemen, buyers and exporters. In 2014, it was reported that five out of fifty mines (10 percent) were producing gold.

Points of interest
The Myanzi–Kassanda–Bukuya–Kiboga Road passes through the middle of town.

References

External links
Website of Mubende District Local Government

Populated places in Central Region, Uganda
Cities in the Great Rift Valley
Mubende District